Weishan Township is a rural township in Ningxiang City, Hunan Province, China.

Administrative division
The township is divided into one community and four villages: 
 Wishan Community
 Tongqing
 Zuta
 Weifeng 
 Weishuiyuan.

Geography
The Xiaolongtan Reservoir is located in the township and discharges into the Wei River.

Economy
The local people grow industrial crops including tobacco, Tea, peach, tofu, fish, silicon and capsicum annuum, which are important to the local economy.

The region abounds with iron.

Culture
Huaguxi is the most influential form of local theater.

Transport
The Huangcai-Weishan Road runs east to west from Huangcai Town to Weishan Township.

The County Road X107 runs south to north from Xiangzikou Town to Weishan Township, intersecting the County Road X036 and Wu-Min Road.

Attractions

Miyin Temple, was built in 813 on Wei Mountain by Weishan Lingyou, in the eighth year of the Yuanhe era of the Tang dynasty (618–907). It is a well known Buddhist temple associated to Weiyang school in China. The Wei Mountain is also a scenic spot in the township and has water sports such as fishing, boating, and rafting.

References

External links
 

Divisions of Ningxiang
Ningxiang